The BAP Handbook: The Official Guide to the Black American Princess is a  humor book released on June 21, 2001.  The book was written by Kalyn Johnson, Tracey Lewis, Karla Lightfoot, and Ginger Wilson, and published by Broadway Books.

It is described by one of its writers as a humor book, written in a tongue-in-cheek manner.

Reception
Cecelie S. Berry of The New York Times calls it "wise, witty counsel".

References

See also
Black American Princess

2001 non-fiction books
African-American literature
African-American upper class
Comedy books
Satirical books
Upper class culture in the United States
Stereotypes of upper class women
Stereotypes of black women
Broadway Books books